The God & Devil Show is an American adult animated web series that had a successful run from 1999 to 2001. The show was produced and developed by Mondo Media and was created by Aubrey Ankrum, who went on to create Happy Tree Friends.

Overview
The God & Devil Show parodies many talk shows that feature celebrity interviews. The show features God as an old man with many flaws and misunderstanding of the modern world, and the devil as a promiscuous woman who enjoys the misfortune of the other characters. All the episodes feature an interview with a celebrity that usually goes wrong at some point, leading to further misfortune. At the end of every episode, the viewer is able to choose if they want to send the celebrity to Heaven or Hell by clicking the button of "God" or "The Devil". In Heaven the celebrity would get something good and would end the episode by saying this is heaven. In Hell the celebrity would get something bad and will end the episode by screaming Nooooooooooooooo!".

Crew
Most of the show's staff worked on other Mondo Media shows at the time and most of them went on to work on the popular show Happy Tree Friends.

Credits
Created & Directed by: Aubrey Ankrum
Executive Producer: John Evershed
Produced by Julie Moskowitz, Liz Stuart & Eileen McKee
Co-Directed by: Jeff Biancalana
Writers: Aubrey Ankrum, Alf Adams, Jay Riddlesberger, Kenn Navarro, Warren Graff, Nick Torres
Animation by Mondo Studios, Wild Brain, Smashing Ideas, Inc., Full Swing Entertainment & "noisemedia"
Additional Art & Design by Jennifer Hansen
Voices: Jay Riddlesberger, Sally Dana, Aubrey Ankrum & the crew of the series
Production Engineer: Julie London
Music: RJ Eleven, Robert Warren
Sound: Jim Lively, L. Kadet Khune, RJ Eleven, Sarah Castelblanco
Technical Direction: Julie Stroud, Scott Walker

Episodes

Chris Rock
Christopher Walken
Chris Farley
Bill Gates
Angelina Jolie
William Shatner
Britney Spears
Keith Richards
Kurt Cobain
Robert Downey Jr.
Steve Irwin

John Travolta
Eminem
Abraham Lincoln
Woody Allen
Stephen Hawking
Bruce Willis
George Lucas
Ron Jeremy
Pamela Anderson
Walt Disney
Tom Green

Tom Hanks
Sean Connery
George W. Bush
Princess Diana
Charlton Heston
Arnold Schwarzenegger
Bill Clinton and Hillary Clinton
Dr. Seuss
Martha Stewart
Calista Flockhart
Spike Lee

John Wayne
Jesse Ventura
Mahatma Gandhi
Marilyn Manson
The Osmonds
Stephanie Seymour 
Mark Wahlberg
Sarah Jessica Parker
Jennifer Lopez
Regis Philbin

See alsoHappy Tree FriendsFaith Fighter''

References

External links
The God & Devil Show at Mondo Media

American adult animated comedy television series
American flash animated web series
American adult animated web series
Fiction about God
Fiction about the Devil
Disney parodies